Bobcat Hills is a summit in the Lanfair Valley of San Bernardino County, California.

References

Landforms of San Bernardino County, California